Lauryldimethylamine oxide (LDAO), also known as dodecyldimethylamine oxide (DDAO), is an amine oxide based zwitterionic surfactant, with a C12 (dodecyl) alkyl tail. It is one of the most frequently-used surfactants of this type. Like other amine oxide–based surfactants it is antimicrobial, being effective against common bacteria such as S. aureus and E. coli, however, it is also non-denaturing and may be used to solubilize proteins.

At high concentrations, LDAO forms liquid crystalline phases. Despite having only one polar atom that is able to interact with water – the oxygen atom (the quaternary nitrogen atom is hidden from intermolecular interactions), DDAO is a strongly amphiphilic surfactant: it forms normal micelles and normal liquid crystalline phases.  High amphiphilicity of this surfactant can be explained by the fact that it forms not only very strong hydrogen bonds with water: the energy of DDAO – water hydrogen bond is about 50 kJ/mol, but it also has high experimental partition coefficient in non-polar medium, as characterized by experimental logP 5.284

See also
Myristamine oxide – An analogous compound with a C14 tail

References

Amine oxides
Surfactants